Steve Emerson is an American visual effects supervisor. Known for his works at LAIKA as a visual effects supervisor in acclaimed films such as  Coraline (2009), ParaNorman (2012), The Boxtrolls (2014) and Kubo and the Two Strings (2016) for which he received an Academy Award for Best Visual Effects nomination at the 89th Academy Awards. that he shared with Oliver Jones, Brian McLean, and Brad Schiff

Filmography

Other credits
 2009 The Mouse That Soared (Short) (associate producer)   
 2005 Rocketbook Presents: The Great Gatsby (Video documentary) (executive producer)   
 2005 Rocketbook Presents: The Scarlet Letter (Video) (executive producer)   
 2005 Shakespeare's Hamlet (Video documentary) (executive producer)
 1996 Gunplay

References

External links
 

Living people
Special effects people
Year of birth missing (living people)